The Women of Windsor is a Canadian  television movie of 1992 telling the stories of Diana, Princess of Wales, and Sarah, Duchess of York, directed by Steven Hilliard Stern.

The movie was filmed in Toronto and London.

Cast
Nicola Formby as Diana, Princess of Wales
Sallyanne Law as Sarah, Duchess of York
Robert Meadmore as Andrew, Duke of York
Jim Piddock as Charles, Prince of Wales
Carolyn Sadowska as Queen Elizabeth II
David Fox as Major Ferguson
Dixie Seatle as Camilla Parker-Bowles
Deborah Burgess as Anne, Princess Royal
Alan Murley as Mark Phillips
Trulie MacLeod as Princess Margaret, Countess of Snowdon
Ron Payne as Prince Philip, Duke of Edinburgh
Nigel Bennett as Lawson
Eugene Robert Glazer 
Deborah Duchêne as Alice
Barbara Gordon as Downing
 Neil Munro as Tony
 Donald Carrier as Private Secretary
 Dan Lett as Assistant Press Secretary
 Adam Bramble as Doctor
Torri Higginson as Gwen
Kristina Nicoll as Priscilla
John Swindells as Police Instructor
Leslie Tidd as Duke of Cumberland
Claire Crawford as Duchess of Cumberland
Edd Scorpio as Royal Chauffeur

Notes

External links
The Women of Windsor, IMDb

1992 television films
1992 films
1990s English-language films
Films directed by Steven Hilliard Stern